The Socotra warbler (Incana incana) is a species of bird in the family Cisticolidae. It is monotypic within the genus Incana. It is endemic to Socotra. Its natural habitats are subtropical or tropical dry shrubland and subtropical or tropical high-altitude shrubland. It is threatened by habitat loss.

References

Further reading
Ryan, Peter (2006). Family Cisticolidae (Cisticolas and allies). pp. 378–492 in del Hoyo J., Elliott A. & Christie D.A. (2006) Handbook of the Birds of the World. Volume 11. Old World Flycatchers to Old World Warblers Lynx Edicions, Barcelona 
 Nguembock B.; Fjeldsa J.; Tillier A.; Pasquet E. (2007): A phylogeny for the Cisticolidae (Aves: Passeriformes) based on nuclear and mitochondrial DNA sequence data, and a re-interpretation of a unique nest-building specialization. Molecular Phylogenetics and Evolution 42: 272–286.

Socotra warbler
Endemic birds of Socotra
Socotra warbler
Socotra warbler
Taxonomy articles created by Polbot